Alberto Sánchez Pérez (1895, Toledo, Spain–1962, Moscow) was a Spanish painter and sculptor.

He fought with the Republican Fifth Regiment in the Spanish Civil War.
His painting, 'Toros ibéricos'' is in the  Museo Arte Público de Madrid,

Sources 
Martin, Peter. Presentación de Alberto Sánchez Pérez, escultor (1895-1962). Corvina. Budapest, 1964. (Consultado en la Bibl.Tomás Navarro Tomás del CSIC (Madrid), en 2011)
Chávarri Porpeta, Raúl. Mito y realidad de la Escuela de Vallecas. Ibérico Europea de Ediciones. Madrid, 1975. 
Azcoaga, Enrique. Alberto. Ministerio de Educación y Ciencia, Dirección General del Patrimonio Artístico y Cultural, Madrid, 1977
Plaza Chillón, José Luis. "El largo y doloroso epílogo de un artista desterrado: el exilio de Alberto en la U.R.S.S. (1938-1962)". Patronato "Niceto Alcalá-Zamora y Torres". Córdoba, 2005
Several authors, Catálogo de la exposición Forma, palabra y materia en la poética de Vallecas. Diputación de Alicante (Alicante, 2011).

Spanish sculptors
1895 births
1962 deaths
People from Toledo, Spain
Spanish military personnel of the Spanish Civil War (Republican faction)
Exiles of the Spanish Civil War in the Soviet Union